Allyn Cox (June 5, 1896 – September 26, 1982) was an American artist known for his murals, including those he painted in the United States Capitol and the U. S. Department of State.

Early life
Cox was a son of Kenyon Cox and his wife, the former Louise Howland King, both of whom were artists. His siblings were Leonard and Caroline.

He studied at the National Academy of Design, Art Students League of New York, and the American Academy in Rome. In 1940, he was elected into the National Academy of Design as an Associate Academician, and became a full Academician in 1962.

Career

Cox apprenticed with his father, whom he worked with when working on murals for the Wisconsin State Capitol. His first solo mural may have been over the fireplace at the Windsor Public Library. Like his father, he served as the president of the National Society of Mural Painters.

In 1953, he was hired to complete the frieze in the Capitol Rotunda, which had been originally started by Constantino Brumidi and left unfinished since the 1880s. He painted murals on many other walls in the building, including a depiction of the first landing on the Moon in the Senate's Brumidi Corridors of the Capitol. Starting in 1971, Cox designed and painted two of the three Cox Corridors in the Capitol, while the third was completed following his designs after his death.

Some of his work may be seen at the George Washington Masonic National Memorial in Alexandria, Virginia. He also painted murals in houses owned by Anne (Mrs. William K.) Vanderbilt and Lincoln Ellsworth.

He served as president of the National Society of Mural Painters from 1942 to 1946 and again from 1960 to 1963.

Personal life
On April 30, 1927, Cox married Ethel Julia Howard Potter, a daughter of Howard Nott Potter and a great-niece of Henry Codman Potter, Episcopal Bishop of New York. His wife's uncle by marriage was society architect William Adams Delano. Cox died of a stroke in 1982.

Notes

External links

Henry Clay by Allyn Cox
America's First Moon Landing, July 21, 1969, by Allyn Cox

20th-century American painters
American male painters
American muralists
1896 births
1982 deaths
Art Students League of New York alumni
Painters from New York City
20th-century American male artists